Aspergillus acidus is a heterothallic species of fungus in the genus Aspergillus which can cause aspergillosis in humans, dogs and cats.

References

Further reading
 
 
 
 

felis
Fungi described in 2013